In the US a certificate of medical necessity is a document required by Centers for Medicare and Medicaid Services to substantiate in detail the medical necessity of an item of durable medical equipment or a service to a Medicare beneficiary. There are different types of CMN for different requirements, e.g., insulin pumps, home health and private duty nursing services, etc.

A CMN typically requires several dates to be specified, such as: 
The "initial date" of the CMN
The "revised date" of the CMN
The "recertification" date (usually for oxygen)
The date the beneficiary signed it
The date the supplier signed it and
The date the physician signed it.

See also
 Medical device
 Medical equipment

References

Certificates of Medical Necessity/Durable Medical Equipment Information Forms

External links
Physician's News Digest article on Certificates of Medical Necessity
 Statutory definition of a CMN at the SSA website
 Medicare manual that provides exhaustive information about the practical use of CMNs, particularly section 5.3. This is the official source of information for contractors administering the Medicare system about the use of CMNs.

Medicare and Medicaid (United States)